A prison cell (also known as a jail cell) is a small room in a prison or police station where a prisoner is held. Cells greatly vary by their furnishings, hygienic services, and cleanliness, both across countries and based on the level of punishment to which the person being held has been sentenced. Cells can be occupied by one or multiple people depending on factors that include, but are not limited to, inmate population, facility size, resources, or inmate behavior.

Description
The International Committee of the Red Cross recommends that cells be at least  in size for a single cell accommodation (one person in the cell).

A March 1991 federal government study of U.S. prisons reported that:
"Until recently, the Federal Bureau of Prisons based its determination of rated capacity in existing facilities on a single-bunking standard, which currently calls for providing each inmate with at least 35 square feet of unencumbered space in a single cell.
 *(minus  of "unencumbered space" leaves  of "encumbered" space, which would likely contain bed, toilet and sink - for a single inmate in a single cell)

"In practice, however, BOP has accommodated inmate population increases by double-bunking inmates in virtually all its facilities and in cells... of varying sizes, but generally in the 50 to 70 square foot range."

Many modern prison cells are pre-cast. Solid doors typically have a window that allows the prisoner to be observed from the outside.

Furnishings and fixtures inside the cell are constructed so that they cannot be easily broken, and are anchored to the walls or floor. Stainless steel lavatories and commodes are also used. This prevents vandalism or the making of weapons.

There are a number of prison and prison cell configurations, from simple police-station holding cells to massive cell blocks in larger correctional facilities. The practice of assigning only one inmate to each cell in a prison is called single-celling or "single-bunking" (as in "bunk bed"). The practice of putting two persons to a cell is referred to as "double-bunking."

In many countries, the cells are dirty and have very few facilities. Other countries may house many offenders in prisons, making the cells crowded.

Prison cells in the UK
In the United Kingdom, cells in a police station are the responsibility of the custody sergeant, who also logs each detainee and allocates him or her an available cell. Custody sergeants also ensure cells are clean and as germ-free as possible, in accordance with the Human Rights Act of 1998.

Prison cells in the US

In the United States, the standard cell is equipped with either a ledge or a steel bedstead that holds a mattress. A one-piece sink/toilet constructed of welded, putatively stainless steel is also provided. Bars typify older jails, while newer ones have doors that typically feature a small safety glass window and, often, a metal flap that can be opened to serve meals.

A limited number of United States prisons offer upgrades. Costing around $100 a night, these cells are considered cleaner and quieter, and some of them offer extra facilities.

High-security cells 

Often, different standards for cells exist in a single country and even in a single jail. Some of those cells are reserved for "isolation", where a convict is kept alone in a cell as punishment method. Some isolation cells contain no furnishing and no services at all.

References

External links

 Celebrity Justice: Prison Lifestyles of the Rich and Famous, Matt Clarke (Article on pay-to-stay prison facilities) 91111 Now

Penology
Penal imprisonment
Law enforcement
Rooms